The men's ISSF Olympic trap was one of the shooting competitions in the shooting at the 1900 Summer Olympics events in Paris. It was held from Sunday, July 15 to Tuesday, July 17, 1900. Thirty-one athletes from four nations competed. Roger de Barbarin took gold, René Guyot silver, and Justinien de Clary bronze. There was a shoot-off between de Barbarin and Guyot (which the former won 13–12), which de Clary did not compete in despite having scored the same as the other two in the main round.

Background

This was the first appearance of what would become standardised as the men's ISSF Olympic trap event. The event was held at every Summer Olympics from 1896 to 1924 (except 1904, when no shooting events were held) and from 1952 to 2016; it was open to women from 1968 to 1996.

Competition format

Each shooter fired 20 shots, with a point per hit. There was a shoot-off for first place.

Records

Prior to this competition, the existing world and Olympic records were as follows. 

Roger de Barbarin, René Guyot, and Justinien de Clary set the initial Olympic record with 17 points.

Schedule

Results

Each shooter fired at 20 targets, scoring 1 point for each target hit. Roger de Barbarin beat René Guyot 13 to 12 in a shoot-off. It was not known why Justinien de Clary was not part of that shoot-off, nor are scores beyond 14th place known.

References

 International Olympic Committee medal winners database
 De Wael, Herman. Herman's Full Olympians: "Shooting 1900". Accessed 3 March 2006.
 

Men's trap shooting
Trap at the Olympics